Hiretsukan (from the  meaning "vicious man" or "despicable person") was an American, New York-based band, that formed in 1998 just outside Washington, D.C., United States. In the following years, they recorded their "Brown Bag" demo, and went out on a few small tours. After a few volatile years which saw several collective moves and incarnations, the group solidified its line-up and relocated to New York City.

The current line-up includes Michelle Proffit (vocals), Dave Sanders (guitar, backing vocals), Derek Wimble (bass), and Justin Williams (drums). The band performs a form of hardcore punk, incorporating melodic indie rock style riffs, often in  time. Michelle Proffit's vocal style consists mostly of screaming and screeching the lyrics. The lyrics lean towards the left-wing side of the political scale.

The band recorded its first EP in early 2002 with producer Don Fury. The result, Invasive/Exotic, was released on G7 Welcoming Committee Records in May, 2002. After touring a bit for the record, the band split up that same year. The members were convinced to re-form in late 2003 by the people at G7 Records. 

Newly reformed with the same lineup, the band began working on songs that would eventually be recorded and released their first full-length album, End States (2005), again on G7 Welcoming Committee Records.

Discography

EPs
 Invasive//Exotic (G7 Welcoming Committee Records, 2002)

LPs
 End States (G7 Welcoming Committee Records, 2005)

Compilations
 Take Penacilin Now (G7 Welcoming Committee Records, 2006)

References

External links
 http://www.hiretsukan.com/
 Hiretsukan on Myspace
 Hiretsukan on G7 Welcoming Committee Records

Hardcore punk groups from New York (state)
American screamo musical groups
G7 Welcoming Committee Records artists